Roger Appleton  (by 1520 – 1558), of Dartford, Kent and South Benfleet, Essex, was an English politician.

He was a Member (MP) of the Parliament of England for Maldon in 1558.

References

1558 deaths
People from South Benfleet
People from Dartford
English MPs 1558
Year of birth uncertain